Magne Gunnbjørn Myrmo (born 30 July 1943) is a former Norwegian cross-country skier who competed during the 1970s. He won a silver medal at the 1972 Winter Olympics in the 50 km. Myrmo won two medals at the 1974 FIS Nordic World Ski Championships in Falun with a gold in the 15 km and a bronze in the 4 × 10 km relay.

A major equipment revolution in cross-country skiing took place during 1973-74 where fiberglass skis (and later from more complex composite materials) replaced a nearly 3,000 year tradition of skis constructed of wood. The Norwegians were behind their competitors in this transition, which caught up with them at the 1974 championships in Falun. Myrmo won the 15 km less than a second ahead of East Germany's Gerhard Grimmer, who was using fiberglass skis, and it became historic, as the last world champion on wooden skis.

His biggest successes were at the Holmenkollen ski festival where Myrmo won twice at 15 km (1970 and 1972) and once at the 50 km (1974). Myrmo earned the Holmenkollen medal in 1972 (shared with Rauno Miettinen), and was named the 1974 Norwegian Athlete of the Year. After retiring from competitions he coached the national women's cross country team from 1978 to 1980.

Cross-country skiing results
All results are sourced from the International Ski Federation (FIS).

Olympic Games
 1 medal – (1 silver)

World Championships
 2 medals – (1 gold, 1 bronze)

References

External links

 - click Holmenkollmedaljen for downloadable pdf file 
 - click Vinnere for downloadable pdf file 
 Magne Myrmo, the last winner on wooden skis 

1943 births
Living people
Cross-country skiers at the 1972 Winter Olympics
Cross-country skiers at the 1976 Winter Olympics
Holmenkollen medalists
Holmenkollen Ski Festival winners
Norwegian male cross-country skiers
Olympic cross-country skiers of Norway
Olympic silver medalists for Norway
People from Rennebu
Olympic medalists in cross-country skiing
FIS Nordic World Ski Championships medalists in cross-country skiing
Medalists at the 1972 Winter Olympics
Sportspeople from Trøndelag